Yoshie Nakada (15 January 1902 – 11 April 1995) was a Japanese painter. Her work was part of the painting event in the art competition at the 1932 Summer Olympics.

References

1902 births
1995 deaths
20th-century Japanese painters
Japanese women painters
Olympic competitors in art competitions
People from Osaka